Roman Gladysh (born 12 October 1995) is a Ukrainian male  track cyclist. He competed in the scratch event and madison event at the 2015 UCI Track Cycling World Championships. His biggest success up to date is European champion title which he obtained at the 2018 UEC European Track Championships in scratch race.

Major results
2020
 2nd Scratch, UEC European Track Championships

References

External links
 
 
 
 Roman Gladysh at the 2018 European Championships

1995 births
Living people
Ukrainian track cyclists
Ukrainian male cyclists
Place of birth missing (living people)
European Championships (multi-sport event) gold medalists
Cyclists at the 2019 European Games
European Games competitors for Ukraine